Anthodon may refer to:

Anthodon (plant), a genus of plants in the Celastraceae
Anthodon (reptile), a genus of extinct reptiles